The 2019 FIVB Volleyball Boys' U19 World Championship was the sixteenth edition of the FIVB Volleyball Boys' U19 World Championship, contested by the men's national teams under the age of 19 of the members of the FIVB, the sport's global governing body. The tournament was held in Tunis and Radès, Tunisia from 21 to 30 August 2019. Tunisia played hosts for this event for the first time.

The finals involved 20 teams, of which 19 came through qualifying competitions, while the host nation qualified automatically. Of the 20 teams, 13 had also appeared in the previous tournament in 2017, while Colombia and Nigeria made their first appearances at a FIVB Volleyball Boys' U19 World Championship.

Iran was the defending champions, having won their second title in Bahrain.

Players must be born on or after 1 January 2001.

Qualification
A total of 20 teams qualified for the final tournament. In addition to Tunisia who qualified automatically as hosts, the other 19 teams qualified from five separate continental competitions.

1.Teams that made their debut.

Pools composition
Teams were seeded in the first two positions of each pool following the serpentine system according to their FIVB U19 World Ranking as of 1 January 2019. FIVB reserved the right to seed the hosts as heads of pool A regardless of the U19 World Ranking. All teams not seeded were drawn to take other available positions in the remaining lines, following the U19 World Ranking. Each pool had no more than three teams from the same confederation. The draw was held in Tunis, Tunisia on 27 June 2019. Rankings are shown in brackets except the hosts who ranked 17th.

Draw

Squads

Venues

Pool standing procedure
 Number of matches won
 Match points
 Sets ratio
 Points ratio
 If the tie continues as per the point ratio between two teams, the priority will be given to the team which won the last match between them. When the tie in points ratio is between three or more teams, a new classification of these teams in the terms of points 1, 2 and 3 will be made taking into consideration only the matches in which they were opposed to each other.

Match won 3–0 or 3–1: 3 match points for the winner, 0 match points for the loser
Match won 3–2: 2 match points for the winner, 1 match point for the loser

Preliminary round
All times are Central European Time (UTC+01:00).

Pool A

|}

|}

Pool B

|}

|}

Pool C

|}

|}

Pool D

|}

|}

Final round
All times are Central European Time (UTC+01:00).

17th–20th places

|}

|}

Final sixteen

Round of 16

|}

9th–16th quarterfinals

|}

Quarterfinals

|}

13th–16th semifinals

|}

9th–12th semifinals

|}

5th–8th semifinals

|}

Semifinals

|}

15th place match

|}

13th place match

|}

11th place match

|}

9th place match

|}

7th place match

|}

5th place match

|}

3rd place match

|}

Final

|}

Final standing

Awards

Most Valuable Player
 Tommaso Rinaldi
Best Setter
 Paolo Porro
Best Outside Spikers
 Tommaso Rinaldi
 Omar Kurbanov

Best Middle Blockers
 Nicola Cianciotta
 Agustin Gallardo
Best Opposite Spiker
 Roman Murashko
Best Libero
 Ilia Fedorov

See also
2019 FIVB Volleyball Girls' U18 World Championship

References

External links
Official website

FIVB Volleyball Boys' U19 World Championship
FIVB U19 World Championship
International volleyball competitions hosted by Tunisia
2019 in Tunisian sport
FIVB Volleyball